Zimiris is a genus of long-spinneret ground spiders that was first described by Eugène Louis Simon in 1882.  it contains only two species, found in the Caribbean, Africa, South America, Asia, Germany, Mexico, and on Saint Helena: Z. diffusa and Z. doriae.

See also
 List of Prodidominae species

References

Araneomorphae genera
Prodidominae
Spiders of Africa
Spiders of Asia
Spiders of North America
Spiders of South America